Apohrosis (Greek: Αποχρώσεις; English: Shades) is the seventh Greek-language studio album and tenth overall studio album by Greek singer Helena Paparizou, released on 29 January 2021,  in Greece and Cyprus by EMI Music Greece.

Background
In December 2018 Helena Paparizou in Tilerama magazine interview stated that she is preparing her new Greek album which will be produced by ARCADE. 
On 14 July 2020 Helena went online on her Instagram account and announced that her new album is called Apohrosis and is going to be release in autumn, however in autumn a delay was announced by artist herself. On 15 January 2021 official release date and album cover were revealed on Helenas official Instagram account. Few days later it was revealed that the cause for album delay was Project Apohrosis - all of the album tracks are going to have a music video  that are going to be posted on artist's official YouTube channel.  It is the first Helenas album in which every song has a music video and also second completely Greek languaged album after her debut solo album Protereotita.

Track listing

Music videos
"Kati Skoteino"
The first single of the album was released on October 15, 2018. The director of the video clip is Alex Konstantinidis.

"Askopa Xenihtia"
The second single of the album was released on March 26, 2019. The director of the video clip was again Alex Konstantinidis.

"Etsi Einai I Fasi"
The video for the song was presented on February 24, 2020. The director of the video clip was Yannis Papadakos.

"Mila Mou"
The video for the song was released on May 25, 2020. The director of the video clip was again Yannis Papadakos.

"Se Xeno Soma"
The song was released on September 15, 2020. The video clip for the song was shot by Yannis Michelopoulos.

"#ProjectApohrosis"
The other eight songs from the album also have videos recorded. They are presented during the period from January 25 to February 25, 2021. The directing of the videos was entrusted to Vangelis Tsaousopoulos.
 "Deja Vu" The video for the song was released on January 25, 2021.
 "Anamoni" The video for the song was released on February 4, 2021.
 "Den Epestrepsa" The video for the song was released on February 8, 2021.
 "Mia Stagona Amartia" The video for the song was released on February 11, 2021.
 "Gia Pia Agapi" The video for the song was released on February 15, 2021.
 "Mi" The video for the song was released on February 18, 2021.
 "Apohrosis" The video for the song was released on February 22, 2021.
 "Adiexodo" The video for the song was released on February 25, 2021.

Release history

Charts

https://www.ifpi.gr/charts_el.html

Credits and personnel
Credits adapted from the album's liner notes.

Musicians

 Helena Paparizou – vocals 
 Sakis Rouvas – vocals 
 Gabyvox – backing vocals 
 Gavriyl Gavriylidis – backing vocals  , guitar 
 Giannis Hristodoulopoulos – backing vocals 
 Hristina Kaloniti – backing vocals 
 Apostolis Mallias – bagpipes (gaida) 
 Nikos Saleas – clarinet 
 Hass – guitar 
 Sokratis Mastrodimos – guitar 
 Kostas Kefalas – trumpet 
 Dimitris Bournis – violin 

Technical

 Kim Diamantopoulos – arranged 
 Giannis Hristodoulopoulos – arranged, programming 
 Giorgos Gaitanos – arranged string 
 Dimitris Iraris – arranged string 
 ARCADE – mixing, arranged 
 Kiriakos Asteriou – programming, keyboards 

Design

 Aris Georgiadis – art direction
 Dimitris Panagiotakopoulos – design, artwork
 Panos Giannakopoulos – photography
 Aris Georgiadis – styling
 Elsa Protopsalti – make-up
 Nasos Asimakopoulos – hair

References

External links 
Official site
Elena on iTunes

2021 albums
Helena Paparizou albums